Zelda Gamson (born March 12, 1936) is an American sociologist, writer and activist. Her scholarly work has primarily focused on the sociology of higher education, in particular innovation and change.

Personal life and education 
Born Zelda Finkelstein in Philadelphia, Gamson is the daughter of Jewish immigrants from Ukraine. She attended public schools in Philadelphia, and studied at the University of Pennsylvania and Antioch College before completing her undergraduate degree at University of Michigan in 1958. She received a Master's Degree in Sociology from the University of Michigan in 1959 and a PhD from the Department of Social Relations at Harvard University in 1965. She was married to the late William A. Gamson. They had two children, Jennifer (born 1960) and Joshua (born 1962).

Career and scholarship 
Gamson's doctoral dissertation about Monteith College, an experimental college for non-elite students at Wayne State University, brought her into the orbit of David Riesman, with whom she later co-authored an in-depth study of mass higher education. Her early research focused on student organizations, student-faculty relations, higher education within Israeli kibbutzim, minority experiences on college campuses, and mass education. She later became involved in national efforts for higher education reform, with a particular focus on undergraduate educational practice. Her work has centered on the ways higher education is and can be organized for civic engagement and the common good, as well as on stratification and inequality in higher education. Her most notable work in this arena includes Liberating Education (1984), "Seven Principles for Good Practice in Higher Education" (1987, with Arthur Chickering), Applying the Seven Principles of Good Practice in Undergraduate Education (1991, with Arthur Chickering), and Revitalizing General Education in a Time of Scarcity (1997, with Sandra Kanter and Howard London). The "Seven Principles" continue to be widely circulated in settings such as college teaching and learning centers, as well as in the development of pedagogy  and educational technology. Gamson was an invited member of the Study Group on the Conditions of Excellence in Undergraduate Education sponsored by the U.S. Department of Education's National Institute of Education. Foundations that have supported her research include the Carnegie Foundation, the National Science Foundation, the National Institute of Mental Health, the Ford Foundation, the Lilly Endowment, the Andrew W. Mellon Foundation, and the Pew Charitable Trusts. She has also written for non-academic publications such as Jewish Currents.

Gamson spent more than seventeen years at the University of Michigan, with appointments at the Institute for Social Research, the Center for the Study of Higher Education, and the Residential College. In 1988, she moved to the University of Massachusetts in Boston, where she founded the Higher Education Doctoral Program and was the Founding Director of the New England Resource Center for Higher Education (NERCHE). She retired from the University of Massachusetts in 1999, and currently lives in Brookline, Massachusetts.

References 

Living people
1936 births
People from Philadelphia
Harvard Graduate School of Arts and Sciences alumni
University of Michigan College of Literature, Science, and the Arts alumni
University of Massachusetts Boston faculty
University of Michigan faculty
American women sociologists
Sociologists of education
American sociologists
Jewish sociologists
People from Brookline, Massachusetts
21st-century American women